Sone Thin Par (also spelt Sung Tin Par, Sung Thin Par, Sung Tin Par) is a prominent Burmese rock singer-musician of ethnic Chin descent. She rose to fame in 1998, and ended a 7-year hiatus from the music industry in December 2012, with the release of her fourth solo album, Thit. She was selected to sing the 2013 Southeast Asian Games' official song, "Colorful Garden" in December 2013.

Sung Tin Par was born in Rangoon, Burma, to Pu Sang Nawn, a police officer, and Pi Nawn Tang. She was named by her grandmother; her name means "treasured flower" in the Chin language. A devout Christian, Sung married Sang Za Lian, also known as Htin Aung, on 5 May 2010.

Discography 
 Ko A-kyaung Nae Ko (2004)
 Set Yan (2004)
 Min Ko (2004)
 Thit (2012)
 Lo Yar Su (2017)

References

See also 
 Music of Myanmar

Living people
21st-century Burmese women singers
People from Yangon
Burmese Christians
Burmese people of Chin descent
1981 births
20th-century Burmese women singers